In the earth sciences, parent rock, also sometimes substratum, is the original rock from which younger rock or soil is formed. In soil formation the parent rock (or parent material) normally has a large influence on the nature of the resulting soil; for example, clay soil is derived from mudstone while sandy soil comes from the weathering of sandstones. Parent rock can be sedimentary, igneous or metamorphic. In the context of metamorphic rocks, the parent rock (or protolith) is the original rock before metamorphism occurred.

See also 
Bedrock
Regolith

References

Petrology
Regolith